King Rikki (titled The Street King in some releases) is a 2002 drama film starring Jon Seda, Mario López, Tonantzin Carmelo and Timothy Paul Perrez. This film was based on the play Richard III by William Shakespeare. It was directed by James Gavin Bedford and written by Jesse Graham.

References

External links

2002 films
2002 drama films
American films based on plays